LRG may refer to:

Science and technology
Locus Reference Genomic, DNA sequence format
Luminous red galaxy in the Sloan Digital Sky Survey

Education
LRG University of Applied Sciences, Switzerland

Companies and organisations
Lifted Research Group, clothing manufacturer
Ludlow Research Group
LRG Capital Funds
LRG Capital Group
LRG Racing

Other
Lairg railway station, Scotland, by National Rail code
Littoral Response Group, an amphibious task group of the Royal Navy